John Franklin Broyles (December 26, 1924 – August 14, 2017) was an American college football player and coach, college athletics administrator, and broadcaster. He served as the head football coach for one season at the University of Missouri in 1957 and at the University of Arkansas from 1958 to 1976, compiling a career coaching record of 149–62–6. Broyles was also the athletic director at Arkansas from 1974 to 2007. His mark of 144–58–5 in 19 seasons at the helm of the Arkansas Razorbacks football gives him the most wins and the most coached games of any head coach in program history. With Arkansas, Broyles won seven Southwest Conference titles and his 1964 team was named a national champion by a number of selectors including the Football Writers Association of America.

Broyles attended Georgia Tech, where was the starting quarterback for the Yellow Jackets and also lettered in baseball and basketball. Following his playing career, he was an assistant football coach at Baylor University, the University of Florida, and his alma mater, Georgia Tech. Broyles was inducted into the College Football Hall of Fame as a coach in 1983.

Playing career
After his graduation from Decatur Boys High School, Broyles studied at Georgia Tech, where he was a quarterback from 1944 to 1946. He graduated from Georgia Tech with a degree in Industrial Management. Broyles started all of Tech's games as quarterback during his senior season, and led the Yellow Jackets to the 1945 Orange Bowl. Tech lost the bowl game, but in defeat Broyles set an Orange Bowl record for passing yards with 304. The record stood for 55 years until eclipsed by Michigan quarterback Tom Brady in the 2000 Orange Bowl. Broyles is a member of the Orange Bowl (1991), Gator Bowl (1995), and Cotton Bowl Classic (1999) halls of fame, and the Georgia Tech Hall of Fame. Broyles was later drafted by the Chicago Bears in the third round of the 1946 NFL Draft.

Coaching career
Broyles entered coaching in 1947 as an assistant coach under head coach Bob Woodruff at Baylor University. In 1950, Broyles followed Woodruff when the latter took the head coach position at the University of Florida. In 1951, he left Florida and returned to Georgia Tech as an assistant under coach Bobby Dodd. Broyles sought the head coaching position at Northwestern University in 1954, and ultimately left Georgia Tech in 1957 when he was offered the position of head coach at the University of Missouri. Broyles stayed at Missouri only one season when he was offered the head coaching job at Arkansas. During his nineteen years as head coach there, he was offered other major coaching and leadership positions, but remained at Arkansas.

During his tenure at Arkansas, Broyles coached the Razorbacks to seven Southwest Conference championships, and two Cotton Bowl Classic wins. His 1964 team was proclaimed national champions by the Football Writers Association of America, as well as the Helms Foundation, and to date is the last Razorback team to go undefeated and untied in a season. If the wire service polls had not given out their national championships prior to the bowl games during that era of college football, Arkansas positively would have won both the AP and the UPI national titles as well, since Alabama (winner of both) lost to Texas (a team Arkansas beat in Austin in 1964) in the Orange Bowl. He still holds the record for most wins by a head coach in the history of Arkansas football, with 144. During the 1960s and 1970s, one of college football's most intense rivalries was between Broyles' Razorbacks and the University of Texas Longhorns under legendary coach Darrell Royal.

Among Broyles' most memorable victories while coaching the Razorbacks was the 14–13 win over No. 1 Texas in 1964 in Austin, the 1965 Cotton Bowl victory over Nebraska to complete an undefeated season, the 1969 Sugar Bowl victory over Georgia, beating No. 2 Texas A&M in the 1975 season finale to win a share of the SWC championship, and then beating Georgia in the 1976 Cotton Bowl.

The two most painful losses in his tenure at Arkansas, included the 1966 Cotton Bowl loss to LSU that snapped Arkansas' 22 game winning streak, and, most famously, the 1969 Game of the Century that saw No. 1 Texas come from behind to beat No. 2 Arkansas, 15–14.

Broadcasting career
After his retirement from coaching, but concurrent with the early part of his tenure as men's athletic director at Arkansas, Broyles served as the primary color commentator for ABC Sports television coverage of college football, normally alongside top play-by-play man Keith Jackson. Broyles' time as a broadcaster at ABC lasted from 1977 to 1985. Broyles was often assigned games involving Southeastern Conference or Southwest Conference teams, but if the primary game of a particular week involved the Razorbacks, Broyles was paired with another play-by-play man, many times Al Michaels or Chris Schenkel, while Jackson called the game with another color commentator, many times Ara Parseghian. Broyles' commentary was normally focused on play calling and coaching strategy, and while paired with Jackson, resulted in an all-Georgian booth (Jackson was a native of Roopville).

As a member of Augusta National Golf Club, Broyles from 1972 to 1977 co-hosted (with tournament chairmen Clifford Roberts and William Lane) the green jacket presentation ceremony at the end of the Masters Tournament from Butler Cabin televised on CBS.

Athletic director
In 1974 Broyles was appointed Men's Athletic Director of the University of Arkansas. (Arkansas had a completely separate women's athletics department from 1971 until the men's and women's programs were merged in 2008.) Broyles continued as head football coach for three years. Since stepping down as head coach, the University of Arkansas men's athletic programs under his leadership as athletic director won 43 national championships. The Razorbacks won 57 Southwest Conference championships and 47 Southeastern Conference championships during his tenure. Broyles disbanded the men's swimming and diving program to satisfy new regulations from the SEC of having two more women's sports than men's sports.

On February 17, 2007, Broyles announced his plans to retire as Men's Athletic Director, effective December 31, 2007, ending his half-century association with Arkansas.

Criticism
In 2000, following an expansion of Razorback Stadium, Broyles announced that one home game would move from War Memorial Stadium in Little Rock to Fayetteville, and that, in the near future, all home games might be played on campus. In the end, a long term agreement was reached to keep 2–3 games in Little Rock, while the rest would be played in Fayetteville.
As of the Fall 2022 season, all home games (7 for 2022) will be played in Fayetteville.

Legacy

Over thirty of his former players have also become college or professional football coaches. Broyles is known for producing high quality coaches and the prestigious Broyles Award, the annual award for best assistant coach, is named after him. Barry Switzer, Johnny Majors, Joe Gibbs, Hayden Fry, and Jimmy Johnson all served under Broyles and have combined to win five collegiate national championships and six Super Bowls. Broyles' assistants have won more than 40 conference titles. Dallas Cowboys owner Jerry Jones played on Broyles' 1964 Championship team.

Broyles' tenure as men's athletic director has seen the construction of world-class facilities for basketball, football, track and field (indoor and outdoor), golf, and baseball at Arkansas. Broyles was selected as the 20th century's most influential Arkansas sports figure. Broyles will be remembered as the only SEC athletic director that had to drop a men's sport, bringing into questions the health of the athletic department under his leadership.

Broyles was known as a fierce competitor both as a head coach and athletic director. Broyles led Arkansas out of the Southwest Conference and into the Southeastern Conference.

In 1983 Broyles was inducted into the College Football Hall of Fame, and in 1996, the Broyles Award was established to recognize the top assistant coaches in college football. He was a member of the Augusta National Golf Club.

In 2005, after his wife Barbara was diagnosed with Alzheimer's disease, Broyles became an outspoken advocate for Alzheimer's awareness and established the Frank and Barbara Broyles Foundation to support caregivers of Alzheimer's patients. With the assistance of the University of Arkansas Medical Sciences, he published and distributed 100,000 free copies of a book titled Coach Broyles' Playbook for Alzheimer's Caregivers to pharmacies throughout the state of Arkansas. In 2007 and again in 2009, Broyles successfully raised funds to distribute 500,000 copies of the book nationally, plus 100,000 copies in Spanish. Since then, the book has been translated into 11 different languages and distributed digitally worldwide. Broyles himself would eventually succumb to complications of the same disease on August 14, 2017.

Head coaching record

See also
 Georgia Tech Yellow Jackets football statistical leaders

References

External links
 
 

1924 births
2017 deaths
American football quarterbacks
American men's basketball players
American television sports announcers
Guards (basketball)
Arkansas Razorbacks athletic directors
Arkansas Razorbacks football coaches
Baylor Bears football coaches
College football announcers
College Football Hall of Fame inductees
Florida Gators football coaches
Georgia Tech Yellow Jackets baseball players
Georgia Tech Yellow Jackets football coaches
Georgia Tech Yellow Jackets football players
Georgia Tech Yellow Jackets men's basketball players
Missouri Tigers football coaches
People from Decatur, Georgia
Sportspeople from DeKalb County, Georgia
Sportspeople from Fayetteville, Arkansas
Coaches of American football from Georgia (U.S. state)
Players of American football from Georgia (U.S. state)
Baseball players from Georgia (U.S. state)
Basketball players from Georgia (U.S. state)
Deaths from Alzheimer's disease
Deaths from dementia in Arkansas
Toronto Huskies draft picks